In Greek mythology, Cragus or Cragos (Ancient Greek: Κράγος Kragos) was a Lycian god identified with Zeus, and humanized into a son of Tremiles, eponym of Tremile which was afterwards named Lycia. His mother was the nymph Praxidice, daughter of Ogygus, and brother of Tlos, Xanthus and Pinarus. Cragus may be identical with the figure of the same name mentioned as the husband of Milye, sister-wife of Solymus.

It is after Cragus that Mount Cragus was named. He was worshiped as the god of victory and strength.

Notes

Reference 

 Stephanus of Byzantium, Stephani Byzantii Ethnicorum quae supersunt, edited by August Meineike (1790-1870), published 1849. A few entries from this important ancient handbook of place names have been translated by Brady Kiesling. Online version at the Topos Text Project.

War gods
European gods
Lycians
Characters in Greek mythology
Lycia